Anatom Airport , also known as Aneityum Airport, is an airfield serving the island of Aneityum, in the Taféa province in Vanuatu. The airfield is actually located on the smaller Inyeug island.

Facilities

Airlines and destinations

References

External links

 
 

Airports in Vanuatu
Tafea Province